Belgrave Trust was a social enterprise firm that used carbon offsets to allow consumers to live more carbon neutrally. Revenues derived through subscribers and the sale of products were used to offset greenhouse gasses through the purchase and retirement of carbon offset securities that fund projects creating clean energy or reducing emissions.

Products and services 

The firm offered three main areas of service:

Environmentally conscious products: A line of products created with environmentally conscious practices, each bundled with a carbon offset component that addressed a specific area of a home, office, or lifestyle
Carbon neutral membership service: A subscription-based service that calculated an across-the-board total estimate of the carbon footprint of an individual or household and enables support of an equivalent amount of emissions reduction through the support of a portfolio of offset projects.
Corporate sustainability services: Through parent company Belgrave Climate Exchange, Inc. the firm offered a suite of analytic and assessment services for businesses working on CSR initiatives.

Timeline and organization 

Belgrave Trust was founded by Nick Baily and Jeffrey A. Stewart launched to the general public in November 2009. The company was based in New York City.

The firm's website debuted in March 2009 as an invitation-only alpha, launched a public beta on November 5, 2009, and exited beta on January 20, 2010. The firm was co-founded by entertainment executive (and Huffington Post commentator) Nicholas Baily, and serial entrepreneur and longtime New York tech community participant Jeffrey A. Stewart.

Other supporters and staff including green trading expert Peter Fusaro; former CTO of  aSmallWorld Neil Capel; serial entrepreneur and pundit Jason Calacanis; original digital media icon and Razorfish founder Craig Kanarick; Erik Dochtermann, CEO of luxury advertising and marketing firm KD&E.

The firm announced debuted a line of environmentally conscious physical products and launched a new store in November 2010.

Values and approach 

The company's focus on the affluent was manifested in what the founders termed an "alignment of values" with the wealthy, which the firm describes through three tag phrases, which appear throughout their marketing materials.

Ease through simplicity: An extreme concern with a very simple and fast method for calculating an individual's carbon footprint, contrasted with the questionnaire approach, and transactional (rather than subscription) model used by first-generation retail voluntary offset services such as TerraPass and Native Energy. The firm referred to an "actuarial" (akin to insurance risk assessment) model for providing carbon footprint estimates by a "drill-down" method, and maintains that this method produces equivalent accuracy to other means.
Strength from diversification: The firm espoused an "actively managed portfolio" of offsets diversified across various types of emissions abatement programs, in varied regions. The company listed multiple projects within this portfolio and several certification standards.
Innovation via markets: According to the Belgrave Trust, markets are instrumental in addressing climate change. The company website cited the discovery of oil in the US as an example of market forces producing rapid results.

Launch of products and attention for Apple initiative 

In the fall of 2010, the firm made its first foray into selling physical products through a limited edition line, created in partnership with New Yorkbased artist and designer Jason Douglas Griffin. Coinciding with a ground-up rebranding and a relaunch of their main site the line's approach was to "pair carbon neutrality with sustainable design" and the firm cited the initiative as a means to raise awareness of climate change solutions and broaden the market for support of carbon mitigating products.

The launch was met with favorable press attention from environmental outlets such as TreeHugger and Discovery Channel as well as design based media such as GOOD magazine and "new ideas" and tech outlets such as PSFK and TechCrunch.

One item in specific, however, landed the company in the spotlight. The LaptopNeutral sticker, designed to offset the emissions for Apple's popular line of aluminum-bodied notebook computers, crossed over from niche attention and became one of 2010's notable climate change stories when it was picked up by Time magazine. Time climate change reporter Bryan Walsh penned a story entitled "Why Your Mac May Not Be as Clean As You Think".  In the story, Walsh notes that "manufacturing aluminum is extremely energy-intensive, and as laptops shift from plastic casing to aluminum, their carbon footprints expand", citing Belgrave Trust's research and comments from Mr. Baily:

The Belgrave Trust, a New York-based social enterprise that calculates carbon footprints and offers carbon offsets, estimates that aluminum-cased laptops like MacBook Air can cause 42% more greenhouse gas emissions in their manufacture than identical plastic-cased versions. In fact, Belgrave estimates that if Apple sells 10 million aluminum-cased items as expected this holiday season, the company would have a bigger carbon footprint from those products alone than a major airline like British Airways or Air France. "It's a lot more energy-intensive than you imagine," says Nick Baily, Belgrave Trust's founder. "The emissions really add up over time. People don't realize that computers are responsible for around 5% of the world's carbon emissions."

Offsets for the affluent 

The company drew attention for choosing to focus on the affluent as its primary audience.

During the firm's invitation-only beta period, it had participated in partnerships with firms such as Cirrus Aviation and Aston Martin. Belgrave Trust first received press attention from luxury and wealth oriented media, including Luxist.com, JustLuxe, and Lussorian, and received  much of its coverage from consumer product and financial themed media, also including Crain's New York Business and Inc.

The company may have been the first to coin the term "luxury carbon" in the context of a consumer product or service.

The firm has acknowledged that catering to the wealthy may be controversial but countered by alleging that the wealthy bear a disproportionate share of the blame for climate change, and that a service targeting the affluent specifically is a necessity.  Founder and CEO Nick Baily, in a speech at the Wall Street Green Trading Summit in 2008, spoke directly to both sides of this point, stating: "So why go straight to the affluent?  Because it's precisely those who have had the most impact that have the means to create a solution." This line of reasoning was common in press interviews with Baily and Stewart, with Baily telling financial news anchor Maria Bartiromo in a televised NBC interview: "The top seven percent of the world's affluent are responsible for half of its carbon footprint. If you're not addressing that, you're missing the point."

Belgrave Trust's approach was also discussed and covered in the environmental community. Mainstream environmental news outlets expressed support, though often acknowledging the likely negative feelings towards the wealthy. For example, TreeHugger said: "The dirty, stinking rich! Yeah, I said it! They are always getting called-out  for their imbalanced percentage of environmental destruction", though they follow with: "Love it or hate it - the mega-rich hold the key for a game changer with carbon emissions." Other environmental commentators such as Corporate Sustainability Wire and have been more unequivocal in their praise.

Major competitors 
 TerraPass
 Native Energy
 Liveneutral.org

See also 
 Carbon offsets
 Emissions trading
 Mitigation of global warming

References

External links 
 

Companies based in New York (state)
Climate change organizations based in the United States